Vinod Nagpal is an Indian film, stage and television actor and a trained classical singer, who mainly works in Hindi cinema. He has appeared in movies, mostly as a character actor.

Career
He made his screen debut with Chashme Buddoor (1981). He is best known for his portrayal of Basesar Ram in the first Indian television serial Hum Log (1984).  After his big breakthrough with Hum Log, he appeared in many commercially and critically acclaimed films like Naache Mayuri (1986), Bhrashtachar (1989), Paappi Devataa (1995), Dance of the Wind (1997), Tarkieb (2000), Khosla Ka Ghosla (2006), Aaja Nachle (2007), Luv Shuv Tey Chicken Khurana (2012), Pink (2016),  Blue Mountains (2017), Jolly LLB 2 (2017) and Manto (2018).

Despite Hindi films, Nagpal has appeared in five English language films and in an English television show like The Perfect Murder (1988),   The Curse of King Tut's Tomb (2006), The Last Days of the Raj (2007), The Cheetah Girls: One World (2008), Tigers (2014) and The Far Pavilions (1984).

In 2008, he played the lead role in a short film named Good Night, which was written and directed by Geetika Narang. It won many accolades including Best Short Film Award at the MIAAC Film Festival in United States.

He is also a trained classical singer. He has performed many songs in theatre. In July 2006, he performed marathi theatre songs with his troupe on the occasion of silver jubilee celebration of Natya Shodh Sansthan at Shishir Manch.

Personal life
Vinod Nagpal has been married to Kavita Nagpal. She was a theatre critic, director and writer, she used to write in Hindustan Times and also in Asian Aid occasionally. She had also directed and written plays. She also directed her husband (Vinod) in one of her plays. She died on 23 November 2021. 

Nagpal was a very good friend to director Mani Kaul.

Filmography

Films

Television

References

External links
 
 

1940 births
Indian male film actors
Male actors in Hindi cinema
Living people
Male actors from Mumbai
Indian stage actors
Hindustani singers
Punjabi people
Musicians from Mumbai
Indian male soap opera actors
Indian male television actors
Indian Sikhs